Theodore Ellis Stebbins, Jr. (born August 11, 1938) is an American art historian and curator. Stebbins is currently the Consultative Curator of American Art at the Harvard Art Museums.

Career
From 1977 to 1999, Stebbins was the John Moors Cabot Curator of American Paintings at the Museum of Fine Arts in Boston. During his tenure, he organized nineteen exhibitions ranging from John Singleton Copley in the 18th century to The Lane Collection and its important holdings of modern art. As curator, he guided the museum's acquisition of over three hundred paintings, from 17th century limners to Jackson Pollock and Andy Warhol. From 1968 to 1977, he was Curator of American Paintings at Yale University, as well as an associate professor of art history for the university.  At Yale, he built the collection of 19th century American landscape and still lifes; his major purchase was Frederic Edwin Church's Mt. Ktaadn (1853).

Complementing his career as a curator and academic, Stebbins served on the board of directors and the Art Advisory Council of the International Foundation for Art Research. He also serves as a trustee for the Heinz Family Foundation, in honor of his high school friend and college roommate, H. John Heinz III.  He has served as advisor to the Henry Luce Foundation, the Whitney Museum of American Art, the San Francisco Art Museums, the Cleveland Museum of Art, the James McGlothlin Collection, and many other individuals, museums, and foundations. He was advisor to the Kingdom of Spain when it acquired the Thyssen-Bornemisza Collection of American Art. During the 1980s, he served two terms on the Art Advisory Panel of the Internal Revenue Department.

In 2014 he published American Paintings at Harvard, Volume One: Artists Born Before 1826, completing a two volume scholarly analysis of Harvard's extensive holdings of American Art. Stebbins retired as Curator at Harvard in the same year, but continues to teach at the university. In 2014, he established Theodore E. Stebbins Advisors, which serves as a consultant on issues of American art to museums, foundations, and a small number of private collectors. His most recent publications "Ray Spillenger: Rediscovery of a Black Mountain Painter."

Education
Stebbins attended Phillips Exeter Academy in Exeter, New Hampshire.  He later received his B.A in political science from Yale University in 1960.  He also holds a J.D. (1964) from Harvard Law School and a Ph.D (1971) in art history from Harvard University. His article entitled The Problem of Tort Liability for the Art Expert has been reproduced in numerous casebooks and for many years remained a standard reference.

Works

Life and Work of Martin Johnson Heade, 1975, 
American Master Drawings & Watercolors: A History of Works on Paper from Colonial Times to the Present, 1976, 
Oil Sketches by Frederic Edwin Church, 1978, 
Boston Collects: Contemporary Painting & Sculpture, 1986, 
Charles Sheeler: The Photographs, with Norman Keyes Jr., 1987, 
The Lure of Italy: American Artists and the Italian Experience, 1760-1914, 1992, 
Still Life Painting in the Museum of Fine Arts, Boston, with Karyn Esielonis, Eric Zafran, and Malcom Rogers, 1994, 
Weston's Westons: Portraits and Nudes, 1994, 
Edward Weston: Photography and Modernism, with Leslie Furth and Karen Quinn, 1999, 
The Life and Work of Martin Johnson Heade: A Critical Analysis and Catalogue Raisonne, 2000, 
The Last Ruskinians: Charles Eliot Norton, Charles Herbert Moore, and Their Circle, with Virginia Anderson and Melissa Renn, 2007, 
Life as Art: The Work of Gregory Gillespie and Frances Cohen Gillespie," 2008, American Paintings at Harvard: Volume Two: Paintings, Watercolors, Pastels, and Stained Glass by Artists Born 1826-1856'', with Virginia Anderson and Kimberly Orcutt, 2008, 
"American Paintings at Harvard: Volume One: Paintings, Watercolors, and Pastels by Artists Born Before 1826," with Melissa Renn, 2014, 
"Ray Spillenger: Rediscovery of a Black Mountain Painter," 2016,

References

External links
Boston University profile

1938 births
Living people
American art historians
American art curators
Phillips Exeter Academy alumni
Harvard University faculty
Yale University faculty
Boston University faculty
Harvard College alumni
Harvard Law School alumni